Joe Ince (29 November 1908 – 1962) was an English footballer who made 51 appearances in the Football League playing as a goalkeeper for Darlington and Gateshead in the 1930s. He was also on the books of Exeter City without representing them in the League.

References

1908 births
1968 deaths
Sportspeople from Ashington
Footballers from Northumberland
English footballers
Association football goalkeepers
Exeter City F.C. players
Darlington F.C. players
Gateshead F.C. players
English Football League players
Date of death missing